The 1956 New Hampshire gubernatorial election was held on November 6, 1956. Incumbent Republican Lane Dwinell defeated Democratic nominee John Shaw with 54.73% of the vote.

Primary elections
Primary elections were held on September 11, 1956.

Republican primary

Candidates
Lane Dwinell, incumbent Governor
Wesley Powell, attorney
Elmer E. Bussey

Results

General election

Candidates
Lane Dwinell, Republican
John Shaw, Democratic

Results

References

1956
New Hampshire
Gubernatorial